"Ghetto Musick" / "Prototype" are songs by American hip-hop duo OutKast, released as the fourth and final single from their fifth studio album, Speakerboxxx/The Love Below (2003). "Ghetto Musick" (also written as one word, "GhettoMusick") is on Disc 1 (Speakerboxxx) and "Prototype" (or "She Lives in My Lap") is on Disc 2 (The Love Below). "Ghetto Musick" was released as a CD single in the United Kingdom on September 22, 2003, and "Prototype" was serviced to US radio in September 2004. The double A-side version was issued in Australia in November 2004, and "Ghetto Musick" was added to US radio during the same month.

Commercially, "Ghetto Musick" charted at number 55 in the United Kingdom in October 2003 while "Prototype" reached number 15 in Finland and was the higher-charting song on the US Billboard Hot R&B/Hip-Hop Singles & Tracks chart, peaking at number 63 (as compared to "Ghetto Musick", which reached number 93 on the same listing). In Australia, the two songs peaked at number 43 on the ARIA Singles Chart.

Song information
"Ghetto Musick" is found on Big Boi's disc Speakerboxxx. The song was released in the UK as the first single from the album. It peaked at number 55 on the UK Singles Chart. It was later released elsewhere as a double A-side single with "Prototype". The song samples vocals from Patti LaBelle's "Love, Need and Want You". LaBelle also appears in the video lip syncing to her vocals. "Prototype" is found on André 3000's disc The Love Below, and was released as a double A-side single with "Ghetto Musick". It did not receive as much promotion as "Ghetto Musick", only being promoted with its double A-side single release and its music video.

A version of "Ghetto Musick" with edited lyrics is used on the soundtrack of NBA Live 2004.

Music videos
The music video for "Ghetto Musick" shows Big Boi during his daily routine as a "Delivery Boi" for Fed Up, a deliberate reference to FedEx. He eats lunch at Patti LaBelle's house, delivers packages to a sorority house—a group of gang members he evades a fight with and an attractive female who tries to sleep with him before her husband arrives with a bat. It is mostly comedic and meant to reflect a Southern environment, including fictional exaggerations of Southern culture such as a "Fish and Grits" restaurant. The video for "Prototype" has a white-haired Andre 3000, who, after landing on Earth with other interstellar travelers, falls in love with a woman played by model and actress Michelle Van Der Water in an idyllic rural area, ultimately leading to the two kissing inside a tent (and with Water’s alien becoming almost instantly full term pregnant because of it) and the two marry the next morning with a son already born.

Track listings

US 12-inch single ("Ghetto Musick")
A1. "Ghetto Musick" (radio edit) – 3:56
A2. "Ghetto Musick" (club mix) – 3:56
A3. "Ghetto Musick" (instrumental) – 3:57
B1. "She Lives in My Lap" (radio edit) – 4:28
B2. "She Lives in My Lap" (instrumental) – 4:28

US and European 12-inch single ("Prototype")
A1. "Prototype"
A2. "Ghetto Musick"
B1. "Unhappy"
B2. "Prototype" (instrumental)

UK CD single ("Ghetto Musick")
 "Ghetto Musick" (radio mix) – 3:56
 "Ghetto Musick" (Benny Benassi club mix) – 6:00

European CD single ("Prototype")
 "Prototype" – 5:26
 "Ghetto Musick" – 3:56

Australian CD single ("Ghetto Musick" / "Prototype")
 "Ghetto Musick" – 3:59
 "Prototype" – 5:28
 "Spread" – 3:54
 "Unhappy" – 3:19

Charts

Release history

External links
 "Ghetto Musick" music video
 "Prototype" music video

References

2003 songs
2004 singles
Arista Records singles
LaFace Records singles
Outkast songs
Songs written by André 3000
Songs written by Big Boi
Songs written by Bunny Sigler
Songs written by Kenny Gamble